Wayatinah is a rural locality in the local government area of Central Highlands in the Central region of Tasmania. The 2016 census determined a population of 34 for the state suburb of Wayatinah.

History
Wayatinah was gazetted as a locality in 1971. The name is an Aboriginal word meaning “brook”.

Geography
The Derwent River enters from the west, flows through Wayatinah Lagoon and then south, where it forms most of the southern boundary.

Road infrastructure
The Lyell Highway (A10) enters from the east and runs through to the north-west, where it exits. Route C604 (Long Spur Road) starts at an intersection with A10 and runs south through Wayatinah Forest Reserve to the Derwent River, where it ends.

See also
 Wayatinah Power Station

References

Localities of Central Highlands Council
Towns in Tasmania